Jeannot Szwarc (born November 21, 1939) is a French director of film and television, known for such films as Jaws 2 , Somewhere in Time, Supergirl and Santa Claus: The Movie. He has also produced and written for TV.

Life and career
Szwarc was born in Paris. He began working as a director in American television during the 1960s, in particular on Ironside. He has also directed episodes of The Rockford Files, Kojak, Night Gallery, JAG, Bones, Castle, Numbers, Columbo, Heroes, and dozens of other series.

His feature films include Bug (1975), Jaws 2 (1978), Somewhere in Time (1980), Supergirl (1984) and Santa Claus: The Movie (1985). Since then, he has mainly directed television films and series.

In 2003, Szwarc joined the crew of The WB/CW television series Smallville as a director. One of the major episodes he directed was "Homecoming", the 200th episode of the series.

Szwarc co-directed, with Miguel Sapochnik, the fifth and final season premiere of the science-fiction/crime series Fringe. He has directed multiple other episodes of the series throughout its run.

He is a graduate of Harvard University.

Selected filmography

Feature films
1973 - Extreme Close-Up
1975 - Bug
1978 - Jaws 2 
1980 - Somewhere in Time 
1982 - Enigma
1984 - Supergirl
1985 - Santa Claus: The Movie
1988 - Honor Bound
1994 - La Vengeance d'une blonde
1996 - Hercule et Sherlock
1997 - Les soeurs Soleil

Television films
1972 - Night of Terror
1972 - The Weekend Nun
1973 - The Devil's Daughter
1973 - You'll Never See Me Again
1973 - Lisa, Bright and Dark
1973 - A Summer Without Boys
1974 - The Small Miracle
1975 - Something Wonderful Happens Every Spring
1975 - Crime Club
1977 - Code Name: Diamond Head
1986 - The Murders in the Rue Morgue
1987 - Grand Larceny 
1990 - Have a Nice Night
1991 - Mountain of Diamonds
1995 - Schrecklicher Verdacht
1995 - The Rockford Files: A Blessing in Disguise
1996 - The Rockford Files: If the Frame Fits...

Television series
Ironside (2 episodes)
It Takes a Thief (3 episodes)
Alias Smith and Jones (1 episode)
Baretta (4 episodes)
The Rockford Files (3 episodes)
The Six Million Dollar Man (1 episode)
Kojak (13 episodes)
Night Gallery (19 episodes)
Columbo: Lovely but Lethal (1 episode)
The Twilight Zone (2 episodes)
Prigioniera di una vendetta mini-series
Seven Days (1 episode)
Providence (1 episode)
JAG (19 episodes)
The Practice (18 episodes)
Philly (1 episode)
CSI: Miami (1 episode)
Ally McBeal (5 episodes)
Smallville (14 episodes)
Without a Trace (12 episodes)
Boston Legal (2 episodes)
Heroes (6 episodes)
Cold Case (7 episodes)
Bones (10 episodes)
Supernatural (5 episodes)
Designated Survivor (1 episode)
Raising the Bar (3 episodes)
Numbers (1 episode)
Grey's Anatomy (7 episodes)
Fringe (7 episodes)
The Protector (1 episode)
Private Practice (4 episodes)
Scandal (2 episodes)
Castle (4 episodes)
Criminal Minds: Beyond Borders (1 episode)

References

External links

1939 births
Living people
American film directors
American television directors
French emigrants to the United States
French television directors
Harvard University alumni
Film directors from Paris